The 33rd New Brunswick Legislative Assembly represented New Brunswick between February 13, 1913, and January 20, 1917.

Josiah Wood served as Lieutenant-Governor of New Brunswick.

G.J. Clarke was chosen as speaker in 1913. W.B. Dickson became speaker in 1914 after Clarke became party leader in 1914. O.M. Melanson became speaker in 1916 after Dickson died.

The Conservative Party led by James Kidd Flemming formed the government. George Johnson Clarke became party leader in 1914 when Flemming was forced to resign. When Clarke resigned due to poor health in 1917, James Alexander Murray served as leader until the general election held later that year.

History

Members 

Notes:

References 
 Canadian Parliamentary Guide, 1916, EJ Chambers

Terms of the New Brunswick Legislature
1912 establishments in New Brunswick
1917 disestablishments in New Brunswick
20th century in New Brunswick